Lloyd Daniel Pierce (born May 11, 1976) is an American basketball coach who serves as the lead assistant coach for the Indiana Pacers of the National Basketball Association (NBA). He has previously coached for the Philadelphia 76ers, Memphis Grizzlies, Cleveland Cavaliers, Golden State Warriors, and Atlanta Hawks. In addition to coaching, he has also played internationally.

Playing career
Pierce made the varsity of Yerba Buena High School as a freshman in 1990. He loved playing defense and was considered one of the best-ever players from the San Jose area. He earned a full basketball scholarship to Santa Clara University.

With future NBA players Steve Nash and Marlon Garnett, the Santa Clara Broncos made the NCAA Division I men's basketball tournament three times in four years from 1993 to 1996.  Pierce helped guide the Broncos to the 1995 and 1996 NCAA tournaments (his freshman and sophomore seasons), advancing to the NCAA 2nd Round in 1996. He was an honorable mention for all-West Coast Conference and averaged 7.1 points, 3.4 rebounds, 2.0 assists and 1.0 steal per game during his college playing years.

Pierce played professionally for four seasons in Mexico, Australia, Germany, and Turkey.

Coaching career

Santa Clara University
Pierce started coaching by serving as a volunteer for the position of director of basketball operations at Santa Clara in the 2002–03 season. He was part of Dick Davey's staff until 2007. In 2016, he would become a finalist for the Santa Clara University Broncos head coaching job.

Cleveland Cavaliers
Pierce served as the coordinator for player development for the Cleveland Cavaliers from 2007 to 2010.

Golden State Warriors
Pierce was an assistant coach with the Golden State Warriors during the 2010–11 season under head coach Keith Smart.

Memphis Grizzlies
Pierce began coaching the Memphis Grizzlies in 2011 and worked under head coach Lionel Hollins. He was also part of the player development staff.

Philadelphia 76ers
Pierce joined the Philadelphia 76ers just before the 2013–14 season. He would be involved with the team throughout the next few seasons, becoming in charge of the team's defense and being involved in playcalling during timeouts.

Atlanta Hawks
On May 11, 2018, Pierce was hired by the Atlanta Hawks as head coach. The Hawks fired Pierce on March 1, 2021, after the team's 14–20 start to the season.

Indiana Pacers
Following his departure from Atlanta, Pierce was hired as the lead assistant coach for the Indiana Pacers.

Head coaching record

|-
| style="text-align:left;"|Atlanta
| style="text-align:left;"|
| 82||29||53|||| style="text-align:center;"|5th in Southeast||—||—||—||—
| style="text-align:center;"|Missed playoffs
|-
| style="text-align:left;"|Atlanta
| style="text-align:left;"|
| 67||20||47|||| style="text-align:center;"|5th in Southeast||—||—||—||—
| style="text-align:center;"|Missed playoffs
|-
| style="text-align:left;"|Atlanta
| style="text-align:left;"|
| 34||14||20|||| style="text-align:center;"|(fired)||—||—||—||—
| style="text-align:center;"|—
|- class="sortbottom"
| style="text-align:center;" colspan="2"|Career
| 183||63||120|||| ||—||—||—||—||

Personal life
Pierce graduated from Santa Clara University with a degree in business management. After graduation, he was a special education teacher for Pinnacle Academy in Santa Clara and also worked for a local financial services firm.

He married his wife Melissa in 2015 and the two first had a child in 2018. Pierce missed three games of the 2020–21 season due to birth of his third child.

References

External links
College statistics

1976 births
Living people
African-American basketball players
African-American basketball coaches
American expatriate basketball people in Australia
American expatriate basketball people in Germany
American expatriate basketball people in Mexico
American expatriate basketball people in Turkey
American men's basketball coaches
American men's basketball players
Atlanta Hawks head coaches
Basketball coaches from California
Basketball players from San Jose, California
Golden State Warriors assistant coaches
Guards (basketball)
Memphis Grizzlies assistant coaches
Philadelphia 76ers assistant coaches
Santa Clara Broncos men's basketball coaches
Santa Clara Broncos men's basketball players
Soles de Jalisco players
Tigers Tübingen players
21st-century African-American sportspeople
20th-century African-American sportspeople